Kaarvan Kismat Ka is an Indian reality game show series that premiered on Zee TV on 29 July 2002. The series aired every Monday at 10:30pm IST, and was hosted by known television actor Jaaved Jaffrey. The series is an Indian adaption of the UK game show The Treasure Trail produced by Chatterbox Productions.

References

Zee TV original programming
Indian reality television series
2002 Indian television series debuts